Rumbani Andrew Munthali (born 2 December 1978) is a Canadian former professional soccer player who played as a defender and midfielder.

Career

Early career
Born in Lusaka, Zambia, Munthali was raised in Canada and played college soccer at the University of Alabama-Birmingham where he was a 2000 Third Team All American.

Professional career
In 2001, the Montreal Impact drafted, but did not sign Munthali. The Richmond Kickers then signed him after suffering several injuries to their back line. In 2002, the Kickers loaned Munthali to the Carolina Dynamo. They released him in February 2003. He then played for the Oakville Winstars. In 2004, he was signed by the Toronto Lynx of the USL A-League on April 7, 2004. He made his debut for the club on April 17, 2004 in a match against Puerto Rico Islanders, coming on as a substitute for John Barry Nusum. At the conclusion of the season the organization awarded him the Public Relations Award. He re-signed with Toronto for the 2005 season on March 31, 2005. In 2006, he moved to China to sign with Nanchang Bayi. On March 2, 2010, he transferred to China League One side Shenyang Dongjin.

After retirement
After retiring, Munthali moved back to Toronto, before moving to America, where he in Fall 2016 was hired as a youth coach at the academy of Sporting Kansas City. As of August 2021, Munthali was still holding the same position.

References
General
 Player profile at PlayerHistory.com 

Specific

1978 births
Living people
Canadian soccer players
Canadian expatriate soccer players
Canada men's international soccer players
North Carolina Fusion U23 players
Toronto Lynx players
Canadian people of Zambian descent
Association football defenders
USL First Division players
Association football midfielders
Sportspeople from Lusaka
Richmond Kickers players
Expatriate footballers in China
Canadian expatriates in China
China League One players
Shanghai Shenxin F.C. players
Shenyang Dongjin players
Zambian emigrants to Canada
Sporting Kansas City non-playing staff